Ceuthophilus pallidus, the plains camel cricket, is a species of camel cricket in the family Rhaphidophoridae. It is found in North America.

References

pallidus
Articles created by Qbugbot
Insects described in 1872